Rune Molberg (born November 21, 1952) is a former Norwegian ice hockey player. He was born in Oslo, Norway and played for the club Manglerud Star. He played for the Norwegian national ice hockey team at the 1980 Winter Olympics. In the last game of the tournament against Romania, Molberg assisted on a goal and scored one of his own with only 29 seconds remaining. This salvaged a tie, but didn't help his team make the medal round.

References

1952 births
Living people
Ice hockey players at the 1980 Winter Olympics
Norwegian ice hockey players
Olympic ice hockey players of Norway
Ice hockey people from Oslo